Yu Bin (born 6 December 1995) is a Chinese footballer who currently plays as a full back for Chinese club Guangxi Yong City.

Club career
Yu Bin started his professional football career in 2016 when he was promoted to China League One club Guizhou Renhe's first team squad. He made his senior debut on 11 May 2015, playing the whole 90 minute in a 1–0 home loss to Shijiazhuang Ever Bright in the 2016 Chinese FA Cup. On 15 July 2017, he made his league debut in a 1–0 away win over Yunnan Lijiang. He went on to make 10 appearances in the 2017 season as Beijing Renhe finished second place in the League One and won promotion back to the Chinese Super League. On 14 April 2018, he made his Super League debut in a 2–1 home win against Guizhou Hengfeng, coming on as a substitute for Cao Yongjing in the 65th minute.

Jiang transferred to China League One side Qingdao Huanghai in February 2019.

Career statistics 
.

References

External links
 

1995 births
Living people
Chinese footballers
Footballers from Shandong
Sportspeople from Yantai
Association football defenders
Beijing Renhe F.C. players
Qingdao F.C. players
Chinese Super League players
China League One players